Kulandei Francis (born 1946) is an activist, social worker, and the founder of the NGO Integrated Village Development Project in Tamil Nadu, India. He was one of six recipients of the Magsaysay Award in 2012 for "his profound faith in community energies, and his sustained programs in pursuing the holistic economic empowerment of thousands of women and their families in rural India".

Life 
Francis was born to Kulandei and Mathalai Mary in the Karipatti village of Salem district of Tamil Nadu. His parents were agricultural labourers and the family was extremely poor. He was the only one of his siblings to obtain a university degree. His experiences of childhood poverty, especially an incident in which the local money lender cheated his mother out of the family's sole plot of land, were catalytic in his decision to take up social work as a vocation.

He completed his B.Com from the Annamalai University in Chidambaram and in 1970 joined the Fathers of the Holy Cross and studied theology at the De Nobili College in Pune. During the course of that decade, he was involved with Caritas India and volunteered as an aid worker during the Bangladesh War of 1971 and the Pune drought of 1972. In 1976 he went to Natrampalayam, a remote rural village in Krishnagiri district where his exposure to the local villagers' miseries proved to be a life-changing experience. That year he renounced his priesthood and in 1979 he founded the Integrated Village Development Project. He has done courses in social development and rural management from Canada and the Philippines. He is married to Kosalai Mary and the couple have one daughter.

Integrated Village Development Project 
Francis started the Integrated Village Development Project (IVDP) in Krishnagiri in 1979. It began with a series of small initiatives such as the establishment of night schools and a first aid center. The IVDP then began a micro-watershed programme that, over twenty two years, created a network of 331 check dams in sixty villages benefiting 40,000 people there. In 1989, the organization began establishing women's self-help groups (SHGs). By 2011, these numbered 8231 SHGs with 153,990 members with savings worth $40 million and a corpus fund of nearly $9 million.  In its award citation, the Ramon Magsaysay Award Foundation noted that the program had "become a financially disciplined, self-reliant, member-owned, and member-managed organization" and that the group's solidarity and its facilitation of credit had allowed for the successful implementation of projects in these villages in areas as diverse as "health and sanitation, housing, livelihood, and children's education, including scholarships, performance-based incentives for students and schools, a primary school for tribal children, and a computer training academy that has, to date, trained some 5,000 children". The IVDP is today active in the three districts of Dharmapuri, Krishnagiri and Vellore in Tamil Nadu.

References 

1946 births
Living people
Ramon Magsaysay Award winners
People from Salem district